Thames High School is a public high school in Thames, Waikato, New Zealand. Established in 1880, it is the second oldest secondary school in the former Auckland Province.

Academics
At all grade levels, Māori language courses are offered, with emphasis on developing confidence in speaking Māori and on an appreciation of Māori culture and values.

Thames seniors have access to Gateway, a student work program designed to educate students about real-life work.

Thames High School's Distance Learning programs include collaborations with the Correspondence School, the Open Polytechnic, Otago Polytechnic and Travel Careers and Training Ltd.

See also
 :Category:People educated at Thames High School

References

External links
School website
Enrollment number
Thames Information Centre

Educational institutions established in 1880
Secondary schools in Waikato
Thames-Coromandel District
1880 establishments in New Zealand